Microdamage in bone can be caused by the various loads to which bones are subjected during normal daily activity.  It occurs in two different types mainly depending on the load: diffuse damage and microcracks.

References
 

Skeletal disorders